Feminism in Latin America dates back to the 1800s. Many important women were advocates in that time period, such as, Juana Manuela Gorriti, a Poet and author famous for her writing on Feminine Liberation. The Latino feminist theory is a fairly newer construct also rooting from the early stages of feminism. Latin American Feminism is a collection of movements aimed at defining, establishing, and achieving equal political, economic, cultural, personal, and social rights for Latin American women. This includes seeking to establish equal opportunities for women in education and employment. People who practice feminism by advocating or supporting the rights and equality of women are feminists. 

Latin American feminism exists in the context of centuries of colonialism, the transportation and subjugation of slaves from Africa, and the mistreatment of native people. The origins of Latin American Feminism can be traced back to the 1960s and 1970s social movements, where it encompasses the women's liberation movement, but prior feminist ideas have expanded before there were written records. With various regions in Latin America and the Caribbean, the definition of feminism varies across different groups where there has been cultural, political, and social involvement. 

The emergence of the Latin American feminism movement is contributed to five key factors. It has been said that the beginning of the revolution for Latin American feminism started in the 1800s with two women, Manuela Sáenz in Ecuador and Juana Manuela Gorriti in Argentina. Prior to these movements, women had close to no rights after colonialism. However, women who belonged to wealthier, European families had more opportunities in education. Then in the 1920s, feminism was reignited and moved towards the political and educational changes for women's rights. In the 1930-50s a Puerto Rican group of ladies founded what is now considered the current movement for Latin American women. Some of these movements included founding the needle industry such as working as a seamstress in factories. Then in the 1960s, the movement changed to advocate for bodily and economic rights of women. The 1970s had a downfall in the movement due to a laissez-faire liberalism combined with free market capitalism. After the fall of neoliberalism, the 1980s brought a resurge of the feminism movement towards political rights. The 1980s also began to shed a light on the topic of domestic violence. The 1990s made strides towards legal equality of women. In today's society, Latin American feminism has been broken down into multiple subcategories by either ethnicity or by topic awareness.

Latin American and Latino feminist theory 
Since feminist theory often relies on Western literary works rather than personal experiences, Latin American feminist theory is a construct that has appeared only recently in order to give Latina women legitimacy in Eurocentric contexts. Latin American feminist theorists are known to not only get their sources from Western countries, but also from Latin American history, personal accounts, and research in the social sciences. There is a controversy known as “epistemic privilege” (epistemic privilege is known as the privilege a person knows or has the first-hand experience on a particular subject. For example, a woman would know what issues impact them more than a man would), regarding how most Latina feminist philosophers enjoy a cultural and economic privilege that distances them from the living conditions of the majority of Latin American women. Feminist philosopher Ofelia Schutte has argued that “feminist philosophy requires a home in a broader Latin American Feminist theory and not in the discipline of philosophy in Latin America.” 

Because Latin America is a vast area, the diversity of this feminist theory can make it difficult to characterize. However, several notable Latin feminist theorists include Ros Tobar, Ofelia Schutte, and Gloria Anzaldúa. Latina feminist philosopher Maria Lugones addressed ethnocentric racism, bilingualism, multiculturalism, and “interlinking registers of address.” Many Latina feminists borrow concepts that Lugones introduced, such as “the role of language, bodies, objects, and places.” Graciela Hierro, born in 1928 in Mexico addressed “feminist ethics and the roles of feminism in public and academic spaces.

Causes 

There is a fairly solid consensus among academics and activists that women's participation in leftist movements has been one of the central reasons for the development of Latin American feminism. However, some Latin American countries were able to attain legal rights for women in rightist, conservative contexts. Julie Shayne argues that there are five factors which contributed to the emergence of revolutionary feminism:
 experience in revolutionary movements showed challenge to status-quo perception of gender behaviour 
 logistical trainings
 a political opening 
 unmet basic needs by revolutionary movements
 a collective feminist consciousness

History and the evolution of feminism in Latin America

1800s 
Although the term feminist would not be used to describe women's rights advocates until the 1890s, many women of the nineteenth century, mostly elite or middle class, tried to challenge dominant gender norms.

Born in Quito (now Ecuador), in 1797, Manuela Sáenz was a “precursor to feminism and women’s emancipation. History has both vilified and glorified Manuela Sáenz - for her affair with Simon Bolivar, and for accusations that say she only “manipulated gender norms to advance her person and political interests.” As an early supporter of the independence cause, she spied on Spanish royalty and held intellectual gatherings called tertulias.

Juana Manuela Gorriti, an Argentinian journalist and writer born in 1818, advocated greater rights for women and wrote literary works with women protagonists that were both “romantic and political”. Similar to Sáenz, Gorriti held tertulias for literary men and women, one of whom was Clorinda Matto de Turner, a novelist sympathetic towards Indians and critical of the priesthood in Peru. Gorriti also worked with Teresa González, an avid writer who ran a girls’ school and advocated education for women.

1900s–1920s 
In the late half of the 19th century there were three main areas of feminists' discussions: suffrage, protective labour laws, and access to education. In 1910, Argentina held the first meeting of the organization of International Feminist Congresses (topic of equality). The second meeting was in 1916 in Mexico.

The 1910s saw many women, such as Aleida March, gain prominence during the revolutions of Mexico, Cuba, and Nicaragua. Additionally, Amelio Robles, born in 1889, was a notable man in a peasant army and the Confederation of Veterans of the Revolution who by modern United States standards would be considered a trans man.

A prominent international figure born during this time was Gabriela Mistral, who in 1945 won the Nobel prize in literature and became a voice for women in Latin America. She upheld conservative gender norms, even at one point saying, “perfect patriotism in women is perfect motherhood”, and that as a teacher she was “married” to the state. However, feminist theorists contend that her personal experiences contradict her language, because she never married, she had a “mannish” appearance, and her close personal relationships with women suggest that she might have been a closet lesbian.

1930s–1950s 
The 1930s, 1940s, and 1950s were full of Latina feminists the pioneered the current Latin American Feminist movement. It was the beginning of the suffragist movement for many Latin American women. The first elected woman major of any major capital city in the Americas, Felisa Rincon de Gautier, was “an active participant in Puerto Rico's women's suffrage movement” that was won in 1932, and her child care programs “inspired the United States' Head Start program."  

Most women advocating for equal rights had to cling onto femininity to gain respect, but feminist theorist Julia de Burgos used her writings to “openly contest the prevailing notion that womanhood and motherhood are synonymous.” Additionally, Dr. Leila Gonzalez was involved in the “Brazilian Black movement” and helped develop “the practice of Black Feminism in Brazil.”

1960s–1970s 
At the end of 1960s, many Latin American women started forming groups of reflection and activism for defending women's rights. Initially, those women were from the middle class and a significant part came from the various left groups. Unlike their predecessors however, Latin American feminists of the 1960s focused on social justice rather than suffrage. They emphasized “reproductive rights, equal pay in the job market, and equality of legal rights.” This type of Latin American feminism was a result of the activism of Latina women against their position of subordinance, not a reaction to women gaining more legal rights in the United States and Europe. As Gloria Anzaldúa said, we must put history “through a sieve, winnow out the lies, looks at the forces that we as a race, as women, have been part of.” 

Such female groups arose amid the sharp radicalization of class struggles in the continent, which resulted in labor and mass rising. The most evident manifestations of these were the Chilean industrial belts Cordón Industrial, the Cordobazo in Argentina (a 1969 civil uprising), student mobilizations in Mexico and others. These facts could be regarded as the sharpest experience and numerous movements of urban and rural guerrilla came to the scene.

For those reasons, Latin American feminist theorist Ros Tobar says that Chilean feminism is closely tied to socialism. Authoritarian regimes reinforced “the traditional family, and the dependent role of women, which is reduced to that of mother.” Because dictatorships institutionalized social inequality, many Latin American feminists tie authoritarian governments with less rights for women. Slogans, such as “Women give life, the dictatorships exterminates it,” “In the Day of the National Protest: Let’s make love not the beds,” and “Feminism is Liberty, Socialism, and Much More,” portrayed the demands of many Latin American feminists. Latin American feminist theorist Nelly Richard of Chile explored how feminism and gay culture broke down rigid structures of life in Chile and was essential to the liberation of women in her novel Masculine/Feminine: Practices of Difference.

Feminist meetings continued to occur, initially every two years; later every three years. Topics discussed included recent accomplishments, strategies, possible future conflicts, ways to enhance their strategies and how to establish through such ways varied, rich and immense coordination between the national and transnational levels.

However, the mid-70s saw the decline of such movements due to the policy of neoliberalism in the region. When dictatorial regimes settled over the majority of the continent, these prevented the development of feminist movements. This was due not only to the establishment of a reactionary ideology based on the defense of tradition and family, but also to the political persecution and state terrorism with its consequences such as torture, forced exile, imprisonment, disappearances and murders of political, social and trade union activists.
While the right wing of politicians considered feminists to be subversive and rebellious, the left in contrast, named them the «small bourgeois».

It also was during this time that leftist feminist organizations gained attention for their efforts. This is most prominently seen in the “Women of Young Lords” of Puerto Rico. The Young Lords were at first, Boricuan, Afro-Taino men who fought for basic human rights and “openly challenged machismo, sexism, and patriarchy.” Bianca Canales, Luisa Capetillo, Connie Cruz, and Denise Oliver became leaders in the Young Lords, and facilitated a “Ten-Point Health Program."

Most feminisms in Latin America arose out of the context of military dictatorships and masculine domination. However, a lot of marginalized women began questioning hegemonic feminism in the 1970s.  These women, whether they were Afro-descendant, lesbians, Indigenous, transgender, sex workers, domestic workers, etc., began to look at different, interlocking types of oppression. Gloria Anzaldúa, of Indigenous descent, described her experience with intersectionality as a “racial, ideological, cultural, and biological crosspollination” and called it a “new mestiza consciousness.”  

Various critiques of “internal colonialism of Latin American states toward their own indigenous populations” and “Eurocentrism in the social sciences” emerged, giving rise to Latin American Feminist Theory.

1980s 

The feminist movement returned to be an important protagonist in the early 1980s after the fall of dictatorships and the establishment of the new democratic regimes throughout the region, with the dictatorship managing to interrupt the continuity with the previous stage.
Feminists of 1980s, e.g. Nancy Fraser, referring to violence against women, questioned the established limits of discussion and politicized problems which before had not ever been politicized, expanded their audiences, created new spaces and institutions in which the opposing interpretations could be developed and from where they could reach wider audiences.

During the repressive period and particularly during the early years of democracy, human rights groups played a major role in the continent. These movements organized to denounce the torture, disappearances, and crimes of the dictatorship, were headed mainly by women (mothers, grandmothers and widowed). In order to understand the change in the language of feminist movements, it is necessary to bear in mind two things: the first is that it was women that headed revelations and subsequent struggle for the punishment of those who were responsible for the state terrorism, and the second is the policy-especially of the United States- to prioritize human rights in the international agenda.

Feminists were able to achieve goals because of political parties, international organizations and local labour groups. Latin American feminist movements had two forms: as centers of feminist work, and as part of broad, informal, mobilized, volunteer, street feminist movement.
At the IV meeting in Mexico in 1987  there was signed a document on the myths of the feminist movement impeding its development. This document has a great impact; it states that feminism has a long way to go because, it is a radical transformation of society, politics and culture.
The myths listed are:
 Feminists are not interested in power
 Feminists do politics in a different way
 All feminists are the same
 There is a natural unity for the mere fact of being women
 Feminism exists only as a policy of women towards women
 The movement is a small group
 The women's spaces ensure for themselves a positive space
 Personal is automatically political
 The consensus is democracy. This is important because each country in Latin America was able to push feminism in different ways – for example, through democracy, socialism, and even under authoritarian regimes (although this was less common).

These myths were commonly disputed at Latin American and Caribbean meetings in the 1980s called Encuentros, a space created to “strengthen feminist networks,” exchange analysis, and confront “conditions of oppression.” Though the Encuentros constructed a common space, the people there made sure it was a place of political dialogue, not of a sisterhood. One of the few points of unity found during these Encuentros was the effect colonialism and globalization had on their respective countries.

1990s 

The neoliberal policies that began in the late 1980s and reached their peak in the continent during the decade of the 1990s, made the feminist movement fragmented and privatized. Many women began to work in multilateral organizations, finance agencies etc. and became bridges between financing bodies and female movements. It was around this time that many feminists, feeling discomfort with the current hegemonic feminism, began to create their own, autonomous organizations. In 1994, the Zapatista National Liberation Army (EZLN) became “a catalyst for indigenous women's organization in Mexico” and created “The Women's Revolutionary Law." Their example of indigenous feminism led the way for other indigenous tribes, such as the Mayans, Quechuas, and Quiches. Zapatista women were made public in 1994. They are used as inspiration and symbolic tools to feminists throughout the world, and are often referred to in scholarly essays and articles. In 1993, many feminists tried to bring together these autonomous organizations in Latin America and the Caribbean, which led to the Beijing Global Conference on Women of 1995.

Scholars argue that there is a strong correlation between the improvement of legal rights for Latin American women and the country's struggle for democracy. For example, because of women's active protests against President Abdala Bucaram's government, Ecuador's Constitution of 1998 saw many new legal rights for women. MUDE, or Women for Democracy, have stated that “what is not good for democracy is not good for women." However, this is not always the case. Peru had an authoritarian regime, but they had a quota for at least thirty percent of candidates in race to be women. It is important to note though, that the advance of Latin American women's legal equality does not get rid of the social and economic inequality present.

21st century 

The emergence of economic neoliberal models at the beginning of the 21st century led to a revival of the movement in the world, which was accompanied by an attempt of feminist dialogue with other social movements. A new feature is the feminist participation in global mobilization at different governments meetings and in multinational organizations where there is a discussion of the humanity's future.

With the rise of globalization and international policies, many feminist political and academic organizations have been institutionalized. The more professional tactics of NGOs and political lobbying has given Latina feminists more influence on public policy, but at the cost of giving up “bolder, more innovative proposals from community initiatives."

In addition, the Colectivo Feminista Sexualidade Saude (CFSS ) of Brazil currently “provides health education for women and professionals,” where they encourage self-help and focus on “women's mental health, violence against women, and child mortality.” 

Today, there are also feminist groups that have spread to the United States. For example, The Latina Feminist Group formed in the 1990s, composed by women from all places of Latin America. Although groups like these are local, they are all-inclusive groups that accept members from all parts of Latin America. Members of the organizations are predominantly from European – Native American backgrounds with some members being completely descendants of Native American people.

Today there is a weak relationship between lesbianism and feminism in Latin America. Since the 1960s, lesbians have become a viable group in Latin America. They have established groups to fight misogynist oppression against lesbians, fight AIDS in the LGBT community, and support one another. However, because of many military coups and dictatorships of Latin America, feminist lesbian groups have had to break up, reinvent, and reconstruct their work. Dictatorships in the 70s and 80s in Chile and Argentina were examples of the resistance to these feminist lesbians groups of Latin America.

In the 2000s, Latin American feminist groups have set goals for their communities. Such goals call for the consolidation of a more organized LGBT community across Latin America. Other goals overall look to change smaller domestic policies that in any way discriminate to members of the LGBT community. They also aim to have more people on office, to network better with the broader Latin people. They have set goals to advocate for LGBT rights in the political world, from organizations and political groups to acknowledge their rights, and encourage other countries to protect feminists and other members of the LGBT community in Latin America. Leaders such as Rafael de la Dehesa have contributed to describe early LGBT relations in parts of Latin America through his writings and advocacy. De la Dehesa, a Harvard alumni, has published books as, “Queering the Public Sphere in Mexico and Brazil: Sexual Rights Movements in Emerging Democracies” that advocate for a shift in popular culture that accepts queer Latinos.  His work, "Global Communities and Hybrid Cultures: Early Gay and Lesbian Electoral Activism in Brazil and Mexico" explains the gay communities and puts them in context to coincide with the history of those countries. Rafael has also introduced the idea of normalizing LGBT issues in patriarchal conservative societies such as Mexico and Brazil to suggest that being gay should no longer be considered taboo in the early 2000s.

Two major areas of focus for the modern feminist movement in Latin America is legalizing abortion, and stopping violence against women.

A key expression of the modern feminist movement and the fight for women's rights in Latin America is the Ni Una Menos. This is a social movement that emerged as a response violence against women in Latin America. It has evolved to encompass and incorporate the fight for other rights as well.

Indigenous feminism in Latin America 
Indigenous Latin American feminists face a myriad of struggles, including little to no political representation across all of Latin America. It was not until the 2000s that indigenous feminists leaders were able to gain any political power. In 2006, Bolivia elected Evo Morales for president, who spearheaded a new Bolivian movement called the Movement for Socialism. This movement allowed for Indigenous working-class women to become members of parliament as well as serve in other branches of the government. Though this important transition of power was more peaceful and much more inclusive than any other country in Latin America, in other countries, obstacles still remain for indigenous women to have any representation or political identity. The Mayan women that live in Guatemala and parts of southern Mexico, for example, have struggled to gain any political mobility over the last few years due to immigration crises, economic and educational disadvantages.

Revolutionary/feminist mobilization 

Some experts, such as Julie Shayne, believe that in Latin America the phenomenon of female, feminism movements should be called revolutionary feminism. Julie Shayne argues that a revolutionary feminism is one born of revolutionary mobilization.

As Shayne was researching this phenomenon in El Salvador during the 1980s, she came across Lety Mendez, a former member and head of the women's secretariat of the Frente Farabundo Marti para la Liberacion Nacional, one of the major political parties of El Salvador. Mendez was at the forefront of the Salvadoran Civil War, and she knew from direct experience how necessary women are to any revolution, though she also believed their role is often forgotten. Mendez explained that women were one of the sole reasons the left had support and was able to move through El Salvador.

In the late 1990s, Shayne traveled to Cuba and interviewed Maria Antonia Figuero: she and her mother had worked alongside Castro during the dictatorship of Fulgencio Batista. Figueroa also described an experience of women essentially carrying a revolution on their backs, but being undermined in the role they played in the revolution or not being to progress past the machismo and sexism, both of which were still rampant after their respective revolutions.

Both of these women's feminist ideologies were born out of the needs for equality they saw were either not being met or being disregarded after their countries’ successful or attempted revolutions.  This feminism born out of the fight against oppressive regimes has given way to a new look of feminism that can be found throughout Latin America.

Feminist mobilization or gathering can be seen in Shaye's research of Chilean women and their nation's government organized mothers’ center. She witnessed that the gathering of these women and the sharing of their stories of oppression and domestic violence lead way to “Strategic (feminist) mobilization”. These gatherings were not only unique to Chile, but were found throughout Latin America - Bogota, Colombia (1981), Lima, Perú (1983), Bertioga, Brazil (1985), Taxco, Mexico (1987), and San Bernardo, Argentina (1990) - through the 1980s known as Encuentros. These biannual meetings brought together grassroot and professional feminists and allowed these women to discuss their experiences and the progression of their countries.

Issues on agenda 
Post-suffrage feminism in Latin America covers mainly three big streams: the feminist stream, the stream in political parties and the stream of women from political parties. Some issues of great concern include: voluntary maternity/responsible paternity, divorce law reform, equal pay, personal autonomy, challenging the consistently negative and sexist portrayal of women in the media, access to formal political representation. Women of the popular classes tend to focus their agendas on issues of economic survival and racial and ethnic justice.

In recent years, the Latin American feminists have also challenged Eurocentric feminist frameworks, promoted literature and art by women of color, and establish their own social groups. They have also sought to challenge traditional nationalists who oppress women and use their political influence to subjugate non-heterosexuals, women, and people of color.

Latina suffragists 
Latina suffragists refers to suffrage activists of Latin American origin who advocated for women's right to vote. 

One of the most notable Latina suffragists is Adelina Otero-Warren from the state of New Mexico. Ortero-Warren was a prominent local organizer for the Congressional Union for Woman Suffrage organized by Alice Paul. She was chosen by Paul to organize suffragists on behalf of the Congressional Union in 1917.

Other prominent Latina Suffragists include:

 Josefina Fierro de Bright
 Luisa Moreno
 Maria Amparo Ruiz de Burton
Maria Guadalupe Evangelina de Lopez, President of the College Equal Suffrage League.

Maria G.E. de Lopez was president of this league when women won the right to vote in California in 1911. Maria G.E. de Lopez, a high school teacher, was the first person in the state of California to give speeches in support of women's suffrage in Spanish.

See also 
 Feminism in Argentina
 Feminism in Brazil
 Feminism in Chile
 Feminism in Haiti
 Feminism in Honduras
 Feminism in Mexico
 Feminism in Paraguay
 Feminism in Trinidad and Tobago

References

Feminism in South America
Women in Latin America
Latina and Hispanic feminism
Feminism by region